Tour Areva (previously known as Tour Framatome and Tour Fiat) is an office skyscraper designed by global architects SOM and located in La Défense, a high-rise business district, and in the commune of Courbevoie, France, west of Paris.

Built in 1974, the tower is 184 m (604 feet) tall.

Tour Areva is entirely black; its cladding is made of dark granite and darkened windows. Its shape is that of a perfect square prism. It is said that its architects were inspired by the black monolith in Stanley Kubrick's film 2001: A Space Odyssey.

The site where the tower was built was codenamed CB1 in La Défense initial master plan. A twin tower of Tour Areva was initially planned at the current location of the Tour Total, but was cancelled due to the 1973 oil crisis.

See also 
 List of tallest structures in Paris

External links 
 Tour Areva (Emporis)
 Expatriates Magazine A Printed publication distributed in Tour Areva for international employees

Skyscraper office buildings in France
La Défense
Office buildings completed in 1974
Buildings and structures completed in 1974